Werner Bachmayer (born 6 December 1960) is an Austrian sprint canoeist who competed in the early 1980s. He won a bronze medal in the K-2 1000 m event at the 1983 ICF Canoe Sprint World Championships in Tampere.

Bachmayer also competed in two Summer Olympics, earning his best finish of ninth in the K-2 500 m event at Los Angeles in 1984.

References

 Sports-reference.com profile

1960 births
Austrian male canoeists
Canoeists at the 1980 Summer Olympics
Canoeists at the 1984 Summer Olympics
Living people
Olympic canoeists of Austria
ICF Canoe Sprint World Championships medalists in kayak